The Helios AG für elektrisches Licht und Telegraphenanlagenbau was a German electrical engineering company. Founded in 1882, it existed until its liquidation in 1930. The company was based in the town of Ehrenfeld, which was incorporated into Cologne in 1888. The company is presently best known for the Heliosturm, a lighthouse on the former site of the factory that was constructed for test and research purposes. Today, the area is used by gastronomy and craft businesses.

References

Manufacturing companies established in 1882
Defunct companies of Germany
Manufacturing companies based in Cologne
Companies of Prussia
Ehrenfeld, Cologne
Lighting brands
Siemens
Manufacturing companies disestablished in 1930